Saarland Airlines was a German charter airline based in Düsseldorf that operated from 1992 to 1993.

History 

Saarland Airlines was founded in 1992 by German entrepreneur Josef Tabellion to take over Turkish charter airline Nobel Air's German routes. Operations began on April 4, 1992 between Düsseldorf and Dalaman with a Boeing 737-300 leased from Maersk Air. In October of the same year the airline leased another Boeing 737 except this aircraft was painted in the airlines livery. In December 1992 the airline took over operations from Hamburg Airlines, in return the owner of Hamburg Airlines, Eugene Block received a 20 percent stake in Saarland Airlines. In Spring of 1993, Saarland Airlines expanded its fleet and leased two Airbus A320-200s. 

The company mainly operated IT charter flights to Portugal and Turkey on behalf of the German tour operator MP Travel Line. When this tour operator went bankrupt at the end of June 1993, Saarland Airlines existence was in jeopardy. To ensure the continued existence of the airline, Saarland Airlines stuck an agreement with the successor company MP Tourism. MP tourism took over the existing charter agreements of MP Travel Line but also their liabilities. The amount of debt, the costs for the return of the holidaymakers and the simultaneous drop in booking numbers led to the bankruptcy of the company on July 28, 1993. Saarland Airlines was unable to win any new customers and consequently the airline declared bankruptcy in December of 1993.

Fleet 
In 1993, Saarland Airlines fleet consisted of three aircraft:

 2 Airbus A320-200
 1 Boeing 737-300

See also 
 Hamburg Airlines

References 

Defunct airlines of Germany
Airlines established in 1992
Airlines disestablished in 1993